Sailing (Spanish:Vela), for the 2013 Bolivarian Games, took place from 24 November to 29 November 2013.

Medal table
Key:

Medalists

References

Events at the 2013 Bolivarian Games
2013 in sailing
Sailing in South America
2013 Bolivarian Games
Sailing competitions in Peru